Neradigonda or Neredikonda is a Mandal in Adilabad district in the state of Telangana in India.

Demographics
According to Indian census, 2001, the demographic details of Neradigonda manal is as follows:
 Total Population: 	24,632	in 4,890 Households. 
 Male Population: 	12,396	and Female Population: 	12,236		
 Children Under 6-years of age: 4,387	(Boys - 2,231 and Girls -	2,156)
 Total Literates: 	10,313

Features
The villages in Neradigonda mandal includes: Bondidi, Boregaom, Buggaram, Koratkal, Kumari, Neradigonda, Rajura, Rolmamda, Tarnam, Tejapur, Venkatapur, Waddur, Wagdhari and Wankidi

References 

Mandals in Adilabad district